Under civil law, Nigeria does not recognize polygamous unions. However, 12 out of the 36 Nigerian states recognize polygamous marriages as being equivalent to monogamous marriages. All twelve states are governed by Sharia Law. The states, which are all northern, include the states of Bauchi, Borno, Gombe, Jigawa, Kaduna, Kano, Katsina, Kebbi, Niger, Sokoto, Yobe, and Zamfara which allows for a man to take more than one wife.

Practice 
Zamfara State was the first to legislate polygamy, which occurred on January 7, 2000. Gombe State has been the most recent state to provide for civil polygamy, legalizing it on December 14, 2001.

As the southern region of Nigeria is composed of mostly Christians, polygamous marriages have not been legally introduced at this time. Attempts to introduce Sharia (thereby legalizing polygamy) have been made in Oyo State, Kwara State, Lagos State, and several others, yet all unsuccessful. Polygamous unions are recognized by customary law in Nigeria, providing a handful of benefits for those in polygamous unions ranging from inheritance rights to child custody.

As of 2009, there has yet to be any debate of introducing a measure that would allow for civil polygamous marriages to be recognized within the entire country of Nigeria, letting the legislation play out on a state-by-state basis rather than introducing a nationwide measure.

Dynamics 
There are no requirements based on religion in the North, therefore Christians are legally allowed to form polygamous unions just as Muslims may do. Christian church leaders such as Archbishop Peter Akinola of the Anglican Church of Nigeria have condemned the practice of polygamy by Christians, with Akinola going on to write "The observation [of polygamy] will destroy our witness if not firmly addressed. We cannot claim to be a Bible-believing church and yet be selective in our obedience." Reports of Nigerian Mormons practicing polygamy have also surfaced.

Despite the four-wife limitation, there have been numerous indications that many Nigerians bypass this law, such as with Muhammadu Bello Masaba, an 84-year-old Islamic cleric who was accused of illegal marriage due to his exceeding number of spouses, in which he had 86 wives. The charges were later withdrawn by the Niger State Sharia commission, with Masaba able to retain all of his spouses.

On an opposite note, it was reported in April 2007 that a Nigerian lesbian, Aunty Maiduguri, married four women in an elaborate ceremony in Kano State, though her union is not recognized by the government, and Maiduguri and her partners were forced to go into hiding shortly after the ceremony to avoid the possible threat of being stoned if convicted for lesbianism, which results in capital punishment for married Muslim women or caning for single Muslim women in Nigerian areas under Sharia Law.

Legality of polygamy by state

Bauchi State 
Bauchi State has been the most recent Nigerian state to legislate civil recognition of polygamous marriages for its citizens, which was established after the implanting of Islamic Sharia law on July 1, 2001.

Kwara State 
Since the introduction of Sharia law throughout northern Nigeria, various attempts have been made to implant Sharia law into the southern Kwara State, which would legalize polygamy. Polygamous unions are currently recognized under customary law throughout Nigeria, but lack numerous benefits in a Nigerian civil marriage. While civil marriage in Nigeria is monogamous, a dozen states and counting have implanted Sharia into their legal systems and thus are exempt. While the implanting of Sharia was unsuccessful, numerous Sharia courts were set up in Kwara State to serve for Muslim legal cases. Sharia has yet to be introduced to the entire state as the governing legal system.

Lagos State 
Polygamous marriages are not permitted  in Lagos State, which has Nigeria's most populous city, Lagos. Attempts to introduce Sharia law in Lagos State, thereby legalizing polygamy, have been made since early 2002, after a dozen of Nigeria's northern states established Sharia as the governing form of law for Muslims, but not non-Muslims, in these states. The city of Lagos currently has a Sharia court that pertains to  civil and legal matters concerning Muslims in the city, though the state does not recognise its rulings as binding, much like the Sharia court in the United Kingdom.

Nasarawa State 
Currently, Nasarawa State does not provide for polygamous marriages, though the status could possibly change. Since the legislation of Sharia law in a dozen of Nigeria's northern states, the debate of legislating Sharia in Nasarawa State soon entered the political arena, sparking both outrage and excitement from the residents of Nasarawa State. The introduction of such a measure failed, but was revived in mid July 2005.

Supporters have vowed to continue their attempts to implant Sharia into the state.  The state remains one of the few states in Nigeria's north that is not governed by Sharia Law, possibly due to the large Christian population. While Sharia law is currently not implanted, there is a Sharia court that operates in the state, though pertains to Muslims only.

Oyo State 
Since May 2002, attempts have been made to implant Sharia law into the southern Oyo State, which would legalize polygamy. Polygamous unions are currently recognized under customary law throughout Nigeria, but lack numerous benefits in a Nigerian civil marriage. While civil marriage in Nigeria is monogamous, a dozen states have implanted Sharia into their legal systems and thus are exempt. While the implanting of Sharia was unsuccessful, numerous Sharia courts were set up in Oyo State to serve for Muslim legal cases. Sharia has yet to be introduced to the entire state as the governing legal system.

Plateau State 
Plateau State currently does not recognize polygamous marriages under civil law. Efforts to introduce Sharia law in Plateau State have resulted in several brutal clashes between Christians and Muslims due to strong opposition by the largely Christian population. As of 2018, Sharia law has not been implanted into the state's legal codes.

Zamfara State 
After the adoption of Sharia Law in Zamfara State in early January 2000, Zamafara State became the first state in Nigeria to allow for legal recognition of polygamous marriage under civil law, as such is practicable under Sharia, which allows for a man to take up to four wives on the account that he treats them equally. Mahmud Shinkafi, the governor of Zamfara State, has two wives.

After Zamfara State established Sharia which brought about polygamy, numerous other states such as Kano State soon followed suit, thereby legalizing polygamy. While the Government of Nigeria only recognizes a monogamous marriage under civil law, recognizing polygamous unions with similar benefits under customary law, states that impose Sharia are not affected by such and therefore can provide polygamy for their citizens.

See also 
 Child marriage in Nigeria
The Church Polygamy 
Polygamy and fertility differentials among the Yoruba and Western Nigerian 
African Polygamy: past and present  
Cultural Sensitivity in Sexually Transmitted Infections (STIs) Preventive Campaign in Nigeria 
General:
Religion in Nigeria
Sharia in Nigeria

References

Law of Nigeria
Society of Nigeria
Nigeria
Women's rights in Nigeria
Islam in Nigeria